Done Deal may refer to:

Music
Ya Boy's cousin San Quinn's independent label Done Deal
Done Deal Enterprises, who claimed a Lil Wayne song and sued Cash Money Records

Albums
Done Deal (Big Mello album)

Songs
"Done Deal", song by Flo Rida and Rick Ross 2007
"Done Deal" (D.B.A. featuring B-Legit, Jay Tee & Baby Beesh ), by Jay Tee (section N2Deep albums) 
"Done Deal", by Kevin Kayirangwa  
"Done Deal", from Love Without Mercy (song) B-side 1992
"Done Deal", by X-Raided from Xorcist (album) and reissued on The X-Filez, Vol. 1
"Done Deal", by rap duo, Totally Insane Backstreet Life

See also
Deal (disambiguation)